Ecuador first competed at the Deaflympics for the first time in 2013 and also went on to participate at the  2017 Summer Deaflympics, winning a silver medal in 2017.

Ecuador yet to participate at the Winter Deaflympics.

Medal tallies

Summer Deaflympics

References 

Nations at the Deaflympics
Parasports in Ecuador
Deaf culture in Ecuador
Ecuador at multi-sport events